Park Yong-ok (born September 15, 1942) is a South Korean politician. He held the position of Governor (도지사) of the hypothetical South Korean province of South Pyeongan (a territory under the control of North Korea) between 2009 and 2013.

Park has held the position of the 30th vice-minister of Defense.

References

South Korean generals
South Korean academics
Living people
Provincial governors of South Korea
1942 births